The United Nations Peace Memorial Hall (or UN Peace Memorial Hall) was established on November 11, 2014 to honor the noble sacrifices and spirit of the United Nations Forces dispatched during the Korean War. Along with being the only UN Memorial Park and Special Peace and Culture Zone of the United Nations, the Memorial Hall is also an international institution that symbolizes world peace. The Memorial Hall carries out a number of UN-related events and activities, including UN Peace Keeping activities in Korea and ODA. It is located in Busan, South Korea.

Founding and overview

The hall opened in 2014 and cost over 25 million won (23.9 million USD) to build. The memorial hall is about 3 stories and over 8336 square meters. It also contains many artifacts from the war.

References

Memorial parks
United Nations properties
Culture of Busan
Korea and the United Nations
2014 establishments in South Korea